Ortaklar railway station is a railway station in Ortaklar, Turkey. The station is located in the center of the town just west of the junction where the Ortaklar-Söke railway splits off and heads south to Söke. TCDD Taşımacılık operates daily regional train service from İzmir to Nazilli, Denizli and Söke. Ortaklar station was originally opened on 1 July 1866 by the Ottoman Railway Company, as part of their railway from İzmir to Aydın. The opening of the station led to the formation of a town which would become Ortaklar.

References

External links
TCDD Taşımacılık

Railway stations in Aydın Province
Railway stations opened in 1866
1866 establishments in the Ottoman Empire